Abasolo may refer to:

People
Abasolo (surname)

Places
Abasolo, Coahuila
Abasolo, Durango
Abasolo, Guanajuato
Abasolo, Nuevo León
Abasolo, Tamaulipas
Abasolo Municipality (disambiguation), multiple places
San Sebastián Abasolo, Oaxaca